Kirk Douglas MacDonald is a former politician in the province of New Brunswick, Canada. Born in Stanley, New Brunswick, he earned a Bachelor of Business Administration degree from the University of New Brunswick in 1997. He was elected to the Legislative Assembly of New Brunswick in 1999 and re-elected in 2003, 2006 and 2010 and 2014.

He represented the electoral district of Fredericton-York and was a member of the cabinet as Minister of Business New Brunswick in 2006. He lost re-election in the 2018 election.

References 
  Kirk MacDonald, MLA

University of New Brunswick alumni
Members of the Executive Council of New Brunswick
Progressive Conservative Party of New Brunswick MLAs
People from York County, New Brunswick
Living people
21st-century Canadian politicians
Canadian Anglicans
1976 births